The men's heavyweight or unlimited event was part of the weightlifting programme at the 1928 Summer Olympics. The weight class was the heaviest contested, and allowed weightlifters over 82.5 kilograms (181.5 pounds). The competition was held on Sunday, 29 July 1928.

Records
These were the standing world and Olympic records (in kilograms) prior to the 1928 Summer Olympics.

(*) Originally a five lift competition.

All four Olympic records were improved in this competition. Josef Straßberger set a new world record in press with 122.5 kilograms.

Results

All figures in kilograms.

References

Sources
 Olympic Report 
 

Heavyweight